Yevgeniya Yermakova (born April 9, 1976 in Alma-Ata, Kazakh SSR, Soviet Union) is a retired female freestyle swimmer from Kazakhstan. She competed in two consecutive Summer Olympics, starting in 1992 (Barcelona, Spain) for the Unified Team.

Her best Olympic result was finishing in fourth place at the 1992 Summer Olympics in the women's 4×100 m freestyle relay event. She was a gold medalist at the 1991 European Championships (LC) in Athens, Greece. Yermakova was barred after failing a drugs test for a diuretic in Monaco in May 2000.

She lives in New Zealand with her husband.

References

External links
 
 

1976 births
Living people
Sportspeople from Almaty
Kazakhstani female freestyle swimmers
Olympic swimmers of the Unified Team
Olympic swimmers of Kazakhstan
Swimmers at the 1992 Summer Olympics
Swimmers at the 1996 Summer Olympics
Kazakhstani sportspeople in doping cases
Doping cases in swimming
European Aquatics Championships medalists in swimming
Swimmers at the 1998 Asian Games
Asian Games competitors for Kazakhstan
Kazakhstani people of Russian descent
20th-century Kazakhstani women
21st-century Kazakhstani women